The 2011 Utah Utes football team represented the University of Utah in the 2011 NCAA Division I FBS football season. The team was coached by seventh year head coach Kyle Whittingham and played their home games in Rice-Eccles Stadium in Salt Lake City, Utah. After playing the previous 12 seasons in the Mountain West Conference, this was Utah's first season in the new Pac-12 Conference in the South Division.  They are the first former "BCS Buster" to join a BCS conference. They finished the season 8–5, 4–5 to finish in a tie for third place in the South Division. They were invited to the Sun Bowl where they defeated Georgia Tech 30–27 in overtime.

Schedule

Before the season
The Pac-12 media picked Utah to finish third in the South Division. Four media members (out of 42 total) voted Utah first in the division. The media picked USC to finish first, but USC will be ineligible for the inaugural Pac-12 Championship Game due to NCAA sanctions. Arizona State came in second, and Arizona, UCLA, and Colorado finished fourth, fifth, and sixth, respectively, in the South Division voting. The media also picked Oregon to win the North Division with 29 first place votes, and to win the Pac-12 Championship Game and thus be the Pac-12 Champion.

Coaching changes
Kyle Whittingham made a few changes to his coaching staff for the 2011 season. Prior to Utah's appearance in the 2010 Maaco Bowl Las Vegas defensive line coach John Pease retired from coaching. During the offseason, Whittingham replaced Pease with Chad Kauhaahaa, a second team all-WAC defensive lineman for Utah in 1996. The previous two seasons he had been the defensive line coach for Utah State.

The Utes also hired Norm Chow to be the Offensive coordinator and coach the tight ends. He had been an offensive coordinator at UCLA the three previous seasons. In 2002, when he was the offensive coordinator at USC, Norm Chow won the Broyles Award.  Former co-offensive coordinators Aaron Roderick and Dave Schramm were reassigned to coach different positions in the offense. They will coach the receivers and the running backs, respectively, positions they have both previously coached for the program. Finally, Whittingham hired Tim Davis to coach the offensive line. Davis replaces Blake Miller who left the program to coach the same position with Memphis. Davis coached the offensive line the previous three seasons at Minnesota and has had a prior stint as Utah's offensive line coach 1990–1996 and worked under Chow at USC 2002–2004.

Move to the Pac-12

During the 2010 offseason, Utah successfully negotiated to join the Pacific-10 Conference (Pac-10) for all sports, including football. Utah, along with Colorado, officially joined the Pac-10  on July 1, 2011 to form the Pac-12 Conference (Pac-12). The previous 12 seasons, Utah competed in the Mountain West Conference.

Game summaries

Montana State
Sources: 

Utah leads series: 10 – 0

Utah played Montana State for the 10th time on September 1. Entering the game, Utah had beaten Montana State in all of their nine games, all but one of which have been played in Salt Lake City. During those nine contests, the Utes outscored the Bobcats 455–25.

Utah once again beat Montana State in their 2011 meeting. Utah built a 24–0 lead with a little less than 12 minutes remaining in the second quarter, and then scored 3 points the rest of the game to win 27–10. The Utes finished with 101 passing yards on 15-of-23 passing by quarterback Jordan Wynn. Running back John White finished with 150 yards rushing to lead the Utes.

Linebacker Brian Blechen set-up Utah's first touchdown when he returned an interception 39-yards to the 8-yard line; Montana State quarterback DeNarius McGhee threw the errant pass. Three plays later, Wynn connected with wide receiver DeVonte Christopher for the touchdown. Montana State punted on their next possession, and Utah's offense had its second scoring drive. This one resulted in a 5-yard touchdown pass from Wynn to White; the drive took nine plays and gained 62 yards.

Utah blocked MSU's next punt. Montana State blockers flipped Utah lineback Matt Martinez into the air, which caused Martinez to block the punt with his feet. The ensuing Utah possession resulted in a field goal; kicker Coleman Petersen successfully booted a 37-yard attempt. Following Montana State's third punt of the game, Utah had a nine-play, 59-yard touchdown drive for their last touchdown of the evening. Montana State scored their only touchdown of the evening with 35 seconds remaining in the first half. McGhee passed to receiver Tanner Bleskin for a 7-yard touchdown reception. Each team only scored a field goal in the second half for the final 27–10 score.

USC
Sources: 

Utah trails series: 3 – 7

BYU
Sources: 

Utah leads series: 55 – 34 – 4

Washington
Sources: 

Utah trails series: 0 – 7

Arizona State
Sources: 

Utah trails series: 6 – 17

Pittsburgh
Sources: 

Utah leads series: 3 – 0

California
Sources: 

Utah trails series: 3 – 5

Oregon State
Sources: 

Utah trails series: 6 – 9 – 1

Arizona
Sources:

Utah leads series: 20 – 15 – 2

UCLA
Sources: 

Utah trails series: 2 – 8

Washington State
Sources: 

Utah leads series: 6 – 5

Colorado
Sources: 

Utah trails series: 24 – 31 – 3

Georgia Tech–Sun Bowl

Utah leads series: 2 – 0

Roster

References

Utah
Utah Utes football seasons
Sun Bowl champion seasons
Utah Utes football